Bath and North East Somerset Council is the local council for the district of Bath and North East Somerset in Somerset, England.

It is a unitary authority, with the powers and functions of a non-metropolitan county and district council combined. The council consists of 59 councillors: 28 from Bath, 8 from Midsomer Norton & Radstock, 6 from Keynsham, and 17 from other areas.

History
Historically part of the county of Somerset, Bath was made a county borough in 1889 and thus was independent of the newly created administrative Somerset county council. The area that would become Bath and North East Somerset became part of Avon when that non-metropolitan county was created in 1974. When Avon was abolished in 1996, its non-metropolitan districts of Wansdyke and Bath were combined into a new unitary authority named Bath and North East Somerset, with its principal offices at Bath.

Before the Reform Act of 1832, Bath elected two members to the unreformed House of Commons. Bath now has a single parliamentary constituency, with a Liberal Democrat, Wera Hobhouse, as Member of Parliament since 2017. The rest of the council's area falls within the North East Somerset constituency. Previously, most of the area was in the Wansdyke constituency.

In 1999 the council housing in the area was transferred to the charitable Somer Community Housing Trust, which was later to become Curo.

Following a successful petition, a referendum was held in 2016 proposing a directly elected mayor for the Bath and North East Somerset district. The proposal was rejected by 78.1% of voters.

Political control
From the creation of the authority in 1995, no political party had overall control of the council until 2015. The Liberal Democrats quickly became the dominant party until the 2007 elections when the Conservative Party won 31 seats to become the largest party, though they did not have a majority. In the 2015 elections, the Conservatives won 37 seats to gain overall control of the council, then in 2019 the Liberal Democrats took control after winning 37 seats.

A boundary change in 2018 meant that the number of councillors elected in 2019 was reduced from 65 to 59, and the number of electoral wards from 37 to 33. Most wards had their boundaries adjusted so that the number of electors per councillor is roughly similar.

The number of councillors by party was:

See also
Bath and North East Somerset Council elections
Healthcare in Somerset
West of England Combined Authority

Notes and references
Notes

References

External links

Unitary authority councils of England
Local authorities in Somerset
Bath and North East Somerset
Politics of Bath and North East Somerset
Local education authorities in England
Billing authorities in England
Leader and cabinet executives
1996 establishments in England